Eremophila perglandulosa is a flowering plant in the figwort family, Scrophulariaceae and is endemic to Western Australia. It is a low, spreading shrub which has small leaves with many glandular hairs and mauve or purple flowers.

Description

The petal tube is purple or mauve on the outside and white with purple spots inside the tube and on the lower half of the lower petal lobe. The outer surface of the petal tube and lobes is hairy, the inner surface of the lobes is glabrous but the inside of the tube is filled with long, soft hairs. The 4 stamens are fully enclosed in the petal tube.

Taxonomy and naming 
The species was first formally described by Robert Chinnock in 2007 and the description was published in Eremophila and Allied Genera: A Monograph of the Plant Family Myoporaceae. The specific epithet is from the Latin compound per-, 'very' and -glandulosa, 'glandular', referring to the many glandular hairs on the branches, leaves and other organs of this species.

Distribution and habitat
Eremophila perglandulosa is only known from near Cundeelee and Zanthus in the Coolgardie biogeographic region where it grows in sandy soils in low Eucalyptus woodland, often with other eremophilas.

Conservation
This species is classified as "Priority One" by the Government of Western Australia Department of Parks and Wildlife, meaning that it is known from only one or a few locations which are potentially at risk.

Use in horticulture
This small shrub has delicate foliage and small, subtle, blue to purple flowers. It can be propagated from cuttings taken during warmer months and grown in most soils in a sunny or semi-shaded position. It is tolerant of both long droughts and frosts.

References

Eudicots of Western Australia
perglandulosa
Endemic flora of Western Australia
Plants described in 2007
Taxa named by Robert Chinnock